Boerma is a surname. Notable people with the surname include:

Addeke Hendrik Boerma (1912–1992), Dutch civil servant
Anthonius Cornelis Boerma (1852–1908), Dutch architect
Scott Boerma (born 1964), American composer 
Thomas Boerma (born 1981), Dutch field hockey player

See also
Boersma